Palm Springs International Airport , formerly Palm Springs Municipal Airport, is an airport two miles (3 km) east of downtown Palm Springs, California, United States. The facility operates year-round, with most flights occurring in the fall, winter, and spring.

The airport was named as number 3 in a 2011 list of "America's Most Stress-Free Airports" by Smarter Travel.

History

Military use
PSP was built as a United States Army Air Corps emergency landing field in 1939 on land owned by the Agua Caliente Band of Cahuilla Indians due to its clear weather and its proximity to March Field and the Los Angeles area.

In March 1941, the War Department certified improvements to the existing airport in Palm Springs as essential to National Defense. The airport was approved to serve as a staging field by the Air Corps Ferrying Command 21st Ferrying Group in November 1941. Land was acquired to build a major airfield a half mile from the old airfield site. The new airfield, Palm Springs Army Airfield, was completed in early 1942, and the old air field was then used only as a backup.

Many of the field's Air Transport Command 560th Army Air Forces Base Unit personnel stayed at the comfortable Lapaz Guest Ranch nearby. Training conducted at the airfield was by the 72d and 73d Ferrying Squadrons in long-distance over-water flying and navigation. Later, training was also provided to pursuit pilot training by IV Fighter Command 459th Base Headquarters and Air Base Squadron. Training was in P-51 Mustangs, P-40 Warhawks and P-38 Lightnings.

On June 1, 1944, training moved to Brownsville Army Airfield, Texas, and the airfield was used for Army and Navy transport flights until the end of April 1945. The auxiliary field or backup field was declared surplus on May 12, 1945, and the main airfield was declared excess and transferred to the War Assets Administration for disposal in 1946 and it was sold to private buyers. The City of Palm Springs purchased the land in 1961 and converted it to Palm Springs Municipal Airport.

Historical airline service
Palm Springs had scheduled passenger service in 1934 operated by Palm Springs Air Lines with Ford Trimotor aircraft with flights to the Union Air Terminal (now the Hollywood Burbank Airport) in Burbank. Western Airlines flights began in 1945–46 followed by Bonanza Air Lines in 1957–58. In 1964, Western Lockheed L-188 Electras flew nonstop to Las Vegas, Los Angeles and San Diego.  Bonanza and successors Air West and Hughes Airwest served Palm Springs for many years with the Fairchild F-27 followed by Douglas DC-9s.  American Airlines Boeing 707s appeared in winter 1967–68. By 1969, American had four Boeing 707 departures a day from the airport, two nonstops to Los Angeles and two nonstops to Phoenix and on to Chicago. Trans World Airlines (TWA) Boeing 707s arrived in 1978, flying to Chicago via Phoenix.

Scheduled nonstops did not reach beyond California, Las Vegas, and Phoenix until winter 1969–70, when American Airlines started a nonstop to Chicago O'Hare Airport. In the 1970s, American McDonnell Douglas DC-10s appeared, the largest aircraft ever scheduled to PSP.  In 1976, American was flying the DC-10 to New York LaGuardia Airport via Chicago O'Hare Airport as well as Boeing 727-100s to Dallas/Fort Worth, Phoenix and Los Angeles.  In 1976 Western Boeing 727-200s and Boeing 737-200s flew nonstop to Las Vegas, Los Angeles and San Francisco. In 1987, Western was merged into Delta Air Lines which continues to serve PSP with year-round service to Salt Lake City (via Delta Connection) and seasonal service to Atlanta, Minneapolis-St. Paul, and Seattle. Other jet service to Palm Springs in the past included flights operated by Air21, Air California and successor Air Cal, America West Airlines, CP Air, the original Frontier Airlines (1950–1986), Hughes Airwest, Morris Air, Pacific Express, Pacific Southwest Airlines (PSA), Pan Am, Reno Air, Republic Airlines (1979–1986) and USAir.

Commuter and regional airlines at Palm Springs from the late 1970s to the 1990s included Air Bahia, Air Nevada, American Eagle operated by Wings West Airlines, America West Express operated by Mesa Airlines, Cable Commuter Airlines, California Seaboard Airlines, Dash Air, Delta Connection operated by SkyWest Airlines, Imperial Airlines, Inland Empire Airlines, Scenic Airlines, SkyWest Airlines (operating independently), Sun Aire Lines, Swift Aire Lines, Trans World Express operated by Alpha Air, United Express operated by WestAir and later by SkyWest Airlines, and USAir Express followed by US Airways Express operated by Trans States Airlines and StatesWest Airlines.

1990-2020: Growth and expansion

During the 1990s, the airport transformed from a single runway into a dual-runway airport with the completion of a nearly 5,000 foot general runway in 1993 and the expansion of the existing runway to 10,000 feet as part of a 1994 master plan. Simultaneously, the airport grew with the addition of the Sonny Bono Concourse in 1999, outdoor courtyard in 2007, and renovated South Concourse by 2007. The airport installed Wi-Fi in December 2004. The renovations and expansions allowed PSP to handle aircraft as large as the Boeing 747. However, commercial flights are limited to aircraft as large as the Boeing 767 due to terminal size limitations.

On December 30, 2006, a U.S. Air Force Presidential Boeing VC-25 (the USAF military version of the Boeing 747), departed Palm Springs International Airport with the body of the 38th President of the United States, Gerald R. Ford, and delivered it to Washington, D.C., for memorial services. Air Force One continues to make an appearance at PSP, most recently in February 2020 with a visit from then-President Donald Trump.

Despite the terminal renovations and expansions in the 1990s and 2000s, rapid airline growth and expansion started in the 2010's.

In 2010, WestJet launched flights to PSP with service to Calgary, Edmonton, and Vancouver. In 2011, the airline added service to Toronto, and upgraded Calgary to year-round service. The airline has since dropped Toronto, but has since added seasonal service to Winnipeg and upgraded Vancouver to year-round. In November 2011, Frontier Airlines launched service to PSP with seasonal service to Denver. The airline served PSP from 2011 to 2021, when it pulled out in favor of expanding flights at Ontario. In December 2011, low-cost carrier Virgin America launched seasonal service to PSP from San Francisco, and in 2012, launched the airport's first ever service to New York's JFK Airport. The airline upgraded service to year-round in 2016. Alaska Airlines, Virgin America's successor, continues to operate Virgin's PSP-SFO route multiple times daily using the Embraer E175 (and occasionally, the Boeing 737), but dropped JFK nonstops altogether. Alaska still offers service between PSP and JFK via San Francisco and Seattle.

In 2013, a new Air Traffic Control Tower opened at the airport, replacing the airport's old tower (which had been in operation since 1967) while giving controllers a better view of planes on the airfield and at the airport. The airport also boosted perimeter security with a radar-based system to better detect airport intrusions.

Delta Airlines began flights to Seattle in December 2014 with the Embraer E175. JetBlue launched flights to New York-JFK in 2016 and Boston in 2019. In December 2016, Air Canada Rouge launched service between PSP and Toronto using the Airbus A319. In December 2018, Delta launched seasonal flights to Atlanta. For the 2019-20 season, Delta upgraded Seattle to mainline and expanded Atlanta to three times weekly, using the Boeing 757. The airline also deployed the Embraer E175 on one of its Salt Lake City flights. In November 2019, Alaska Airlines launched flights to Everett’s Paine Field, supplementing the airline's existing service to nearby Seattle-Tacoma.

However, in 2020, as a result of the onset of the COVID-19 pandemic, airlines suspended most seasonal and some year-round destinations as traffic plummeted during the month of March, and Canadian service being almost eliminated entirely due to the temporary closure of the Canada-United States border (even though WestJet continued serving PSP with reduced frequency). However, thanks to increased popularity in outdoor destinations and residents from larger cities relocating to Palm Springs (and the surrounding areas), the pandemic gave airlines a unique opportunity to tap into and/or expand their presence at PSP.

2020-present: Record-breaking growth

In September 2020, Southwest Airlines announced plans to serve Palm Springs, year-round. Flights to Oakland, Phoenix, and Denver launched in November 2020, and flights to Las Vegas launched in May 2021.

In December 2020, Delta resumed service to Atlanta and Minneapolis-St. Paul with the Boeing 737 and Seattle with the Embraer E175. Also, Alaska added flights to San Jose, Reno, and Boise using the Embraer E175. Simultaneously, American and JetBlue announced flights to Philadelphia and Fort Lauderdale, respectively. Although Philadelphia, Fort Lauderdale, and Reno have since been discontinued, Alaska upgraded San Jose to daily, year-round service, and expanded Everett to twice daily during peak season. American also upgraded select Phoenix flights to mainline, and increased frequency to Dallas/Fort Worth during peak season using the Boeing 737 and Airbus A321. JetBlue even upgraded select Boston and JFK flights to the Airbus A321, although the vast majority of flights utilize the Airbus A320.

Delta upgraded Atlanta from three-times weekly to daily service from December through April with the Boeing 737, and upgraded Minneapolis-St. Paul to double-daily service during peak season using the Boeing 737 or Airbus A320 (depending on passenger demand). The airline also restored mainline service to Seattle using the Boeing 737 and Airbus A220, becoming the first (and currently only) airline operating the A220 into PSP. Delta also added capacity on the long-running Salt Lake City route by swapping out the CRJ-200 in favor of the larger CRJ-900 and Embraer E175, and increased frequency to 3x daily (4x daily during peak season).

In August 2021, the airport renovated and expanded the ticketing area. It also installed a new baggage handling system to cope with increased passenger growth and demand.

During the 2021-22 winter season, airlines continued expanding at PSP, allowing passenger traffic to meet and even exceed pre-pandemic levels.

In October 2021, Southwest Airlines launched daily, year-round flights to Sacramento. In November, the airline inaugurated flights to Chicago-Midway, Dallas-Love Field, and Portland, Oregon. Although Chicago-Midway has since been dropped, the airline upgraded Sacramento and Las Vegas to double daily service. Portland remains a Saturday-only service during peak season. Simultaneously, Allegiant launched seasonal flights to Nashville, Tennessee and Des Moines. On November 19, Alaska Airlines launched flights to Austin, Texas and later expanded its seasonal PDX service into June (using the Embraer E175 from April through June). With the reopening of the Canada-United States Border, Canadian service was restored with the return of Air Canada on November 4, 2021 and the entrance of Canadian ultra-low cost carriers Swoop and Flair in December.

In January 2022, AHA! Airlines launched flights to Reno using the Embraer E145 operated by ExpressJet. However, AHA! ceased operations in August of that year (due to ExpressJet's bankruptcy), and Swoop has since pulled out. Flair continues to connect PSP to Vancouver, Toronto, and Edmonton during the winter tourist season, while WestJet resumed its own seasonal service to Edmonton. Air Canada also fully restored seasonal service to Toronto (via Air Canada Rogue) and Vancouver using the Airbus A320 family and Boeing 737 MAX, respectively. Reno can still be reached via a connection on American, Southwest, or United.

In March, PSP launched a new incentive program to attract more year-round domestic and international service (from cities with U.S. Border Preclearance), along with nonstop flights to Hawaii. That summer, PSP was ranked as America's 62nd busiest airport and one of America's fastest growing airports in the midst of a record-breaking summer. WestJet also restored year-round service to Vancouver and Calgary, becoming the only Canadian carrier to serve PSP year-round.

For the 2022-23 season, airlines further adjusted their schedules to meet passenger demand.

In September, American and Alaska relaunched their respective seasonal services to Chicago O’Hare and Portland one month early, owing to record passenger growth during the summer. In November, Air Canada Rogue began flying the Airbus A321 on select frequencies to Toronto, while American upgraded Chicago O’Hare to double-daily service during peak season, filling the void left by the discontinuation of its PSP-Philadelphia flight. Southwest Airlines launched daily flights to San Jose, California, making the airline the largest in terms of destinations served. Avelo Airlines launched seasonal flights to Eugene, Santa Rosa, and Redmond/Bend, with PSP becoming Avelo’s 30th destination. Meanwhile, Alaska Airlines dropped flights to Austin, Texas, while American Eagle launched their own flights to Austin using Embraer E175's operated by Envoy Air. Allegiant Air also dropped Nashville flights in favor of Bellingham and Des Moines, while Delta upgraded its  seasonal Minneapolis-St. Paul flights from once daily (twice-daily during peak season) to twice daily to fill the void.

In December 2022, PSP announced it will be doubling the number of restaurants and renovating the airport's current shops, along with adding duty-free shopping for the first time in the airport's history. The multi-phase project is expected to begin in February 2023, and be completed by the end of 2024.

U.S. customs clearance
Although a true international airport, PSP only has U.S. customs and immigration facilities for general aviation aircraft including business jets. All international airline flights are currently operated from Canadian cities that have pre-clearance facilities.

Terminals

PSP's passenger terminal consists of three parts—the main building, the elevated Sonny Bono Concourse to the north, and a yet-unnamed concourse to the south. The airport has 19 total gates. Airside, it has a unique open-air layout in that all passenger walkways connecting these structures are roofless.

Main Building
The main building is the land side of the airport. Road traffic accesses the airport directly off of Tahquitz Canyon Way (from downtown) or Kirk Douglas Way, itself fed by Ramon Road from points east. Uncovered parking areas are directly in front of the building. The center section houses the security screening area and automatic doors to/from the open-air walkways airside. Ticketing is on the right (south) wing, while baggage claim and car rental counters are on the left (north). The main building opened in 1966 and was designed by Donald Wrexler.

Departing passengers are routed first to airline ticket counters or kiosks for checking in. Since all gates at Palm Springs are in the two outlying concourses, passengers must pass through the security screening area for admittance into the secure air side of the airport.

Outdoor Courtyard
After clearing security, passengers leave the main building via the automatic doors and enter the open-air courtyard, which contains a full-service restaurant, coffee shop, and multiple sets of restrooms. A children's playground and pet relief area are adjacent to the Sonny Bono concourse. It is through this courtyard that passengers access the nineteen full-service gates at the two concourses. There is also a hardstand adjacent to the restaurant (Gate 1) that can be used as a boarding gate when gates at the two concourses are unavailable or if an aircraft needs to park for mechanical reasons.

Sonny Bono Concourse (Gates 4–11)
On November 4, 1999, the new Sonny Bono Concourse opened as part of the 1994–2000 expansion. Named in honor of the late singer, congressman and former mayor of the city, this newer concourse has 8 gates (all with jet bridges) and is the elevated one of the two. It is designed to handle larger aircraft (such as the Boeing 737 and the Airbus A320 family) because of its jet bridges. Although it is capable of handling aircraft as large as the Boeing 767, it is commonly used by the Boeing 737, Airbus A320 family, and the Embraer E175. SB's outdoor escalator and walkway are shaded by a designer roofline similar to that of the Denver International Airport.

Amenities include a full-service restaurant, golf pro shop, and two newsstands.

Regional Concourse (Gates 12–20)
The older Regional Concourse on the south side, simply known as the Regional Concourse on the airport website, or "Gates 12–20" on airport signage, is at the tarmac level and hosts smaller aircraft such as the Embraer ERJ and Bombardier CRJ. There are 11 gates, which are all hardstands, 6 of which are capable of handling larger aircraft (up to the Airbus A321) should the need arise. It also contains the airport's only hardstands for the Airbus A220. Boarding uses ramps or airstairs.

Amenities include a restaurant, newsstand, and restrooms. There is also a fountain adjacent to the concourse entrance.

Airlines and destinations

Passenger

Cargo

Statistics
In the year ending December 31, 2018, the airport had 57,512 aircraft operations, average 158 per day: 41% general aviation, 37% airline, 19% air taxi, and 3% military. 81 aircraft at the time were based at the airport: 62 single-engine, 8 multi-engine, 10 jet, and 1 helicopter.

Airport traffic

Top destinations

Airline market share

Ground transportation
State Route 111 (Gene Autry Trail) is accessible to PSP via Ramon Road.

PSP is served by both municipal and regional routes. Sunline's SunBus routes 2 and 4 provide direct service to downtown Palm Springs via the bus stops at El Cielo/Kirk Douglas and Tahquitz/Civic. Morongo Basin Transit Authority provides service to Twentynine Palms. An Amtrak Thruway bus stop is located just outside the baggage claim area, with service to Cabazon (Morongo Casino), Riverside, and Fullerton. The Idyllwild Shuttle provides weekly connections to Mountain Center and Idyllwild–Pine Cove.

Accidents and incidents at or near PSP

On October 23, 1942, American Airlines Flight 28, a Douglas DC-3 (reg. NC16017) en route to New York City, crashed in Chino Canyon, 3.1 miles (5 km) north of then Palm Springs Municipal Airport after being clipped by a United States Army Air Force Lockheed B-34 Ventura II bomber. All nine passengers and three crew were killed on the DC-3. The bomber (reg. 41–38116) landed safely at Palm Springs Municipal Airport with minor damage.
On February 13, 1958, Western Airlines Flight 19, a Convair CV-240 crash-landed and was destroyed after striking boulders and large mounds of drifted sand on desert terrain 4.1 miles NNW of PSP due to separation of the right wing leading edge in flight. Of the 18 passengers and three crew, there were no fatalities, but five passengers were seriously injured, and most of the rest had minor injuries. The aircraft was heavily damaged and written off.
On November 14, 1965, a Paul Kelly Flying Service Learjet 23 crashed 13.1 miles east of PSP at night when the aircraft lost control and crashed in a 55-degree nose-down vertical left bank attitude due to spatial disorientation of the pilot. Both crew and all six passengers died.
On September 23, 1967, a Bird Corp. Oakland Centaurus, a modified Lockheed Ventura, crashed in the initial climb after the right engine failed. Both occupants survived, but the aircraft was written off.
On January 6, 1977, a Jet Avia Learjet 24B impacted a mountain at 9,700 feet 21.9 miles NW of PSP en route to Las Vegas. The crew misinterpreted instrument flight rules clearance and air traffic control instructions, and maintained the runway heading. All four occupants (two crew, two passengers) were killed.
On December 4, 2020, a Cessna 172N Skyhawk crashed nose-first onto the main runway during an emergency landing. The sole occupant, the female pilot, was seriously injured and was rushed to a nearby hospital.

See also

 California World War II Army Airfields
 Air Transport Command
 Palm Springs Air Museum

References

 www.airfieldsdatabase.com

External links

 Palm Springs International Airport (official site)
 Signature Flight Support
 

Airports in Riverside County, California
Buildings and structures in Palm Springs, California
Coachella Valley
1961 establishments in California
Airports established in 1961